Monaco competed at the 1988 Summer Olympics in Seoul, South Korea. Nine competitors, eight men and one woman, took part in nine events in seven sports.

Competitors
The following is the list of number of competitors in the Games.

Archery

Men's individual
 Gilles Cresto - preliminary round, 65th place

Athletics

Cycling

One male cyclists represented Monaco in 1988.

Men's road race
 Stéphane Operto

Fencing

One male fencer represented Monaco in 1988.

Men's sabre
 Olivier Martini

Judo

Sailing

Shooting

References

Nations at the 1988 Summer Olympics
1988
1988 in Monégasque sport